Abd al-Malik II may refer to:
Abu Marwan Abd al-Malik II, a Sultan of Morocco from 1627 to 1631
Abd al-Malik II (Samanid emir), amir of the Samanids (999)